Ikboljon Akramov (born 10 October 1983 in Fergana, Uzbek SSR, Soviet Union) is Uzbek footballer who plays as a midfielder for FK Neftchi Farg'ona. He is a member of Uzbekistan national football team.

References

External links
 

1983 births
Living people
Uzbekistani footballers
Uzbekistan international footballers
2007 AFC Asian Cup players

Association football midfielders